The 1792 New York gubernatorial election was held in April 1792 to elect the Governor and Lieutenant Governor of New York.

Candidates
The Democratic-Republican Party nominated incumbent George Clinton. They nominated incumbent Pierre Van Cortlandt for lieutenant governor.

The Federalist Party nominated Chief Justice of the United States John Jay. They nominated state senator Stephen Van Rensselaer for lieutenant governor.

Results
John Jay received more votes than George Clinton, but on technicalities the votes of Otsego, Tioga and Clinton counties were disqualified and not canvassed, giving George Clinton a slight majority in the official result.

Under the Constitution of 1777, the votes were canvassed by a joint committee of the New York State Legislature, six members each from the Assembly and the Senate. The members were David Gelston, Thomas Tillotson, Melancton Smith, Daniel Graham, Pierre Van Cortlandt, Jr., David McCarty, Jonathan N. Havens, Samuel Jones, Isaac Roosevelt, Leonard Gansevoort and Joshua Sands. The state constitution said that the cast ballots shall be delivered to the Secretary of State "by the sheriff or his deputy". The ballots from Otsego County were forwarded to the secretary of state by Sheriff Smith who was holding over in office until the appointment of a successor after his term had expired. The ballot box from Clinton County was delivered to the secretary of state's office by a person without a written deputation who had received the box from the sheriff. The ballot box from Tioga County was delivered to the secretary of state by the clerk of the special deputy appointed by the sheriff.

The canvass committee disagreed on whether to allow these ballots to be counted or not. The question was referred to the United States senators from New York, Federalist Rufus King and Democratic-Republican Aaron Burr, for arbitration. King said all votes ought to be canvassed, Burr said that the ballots from Clinton County ought to be allowed, the ones from Otsego and Tioga counties should be rejected. Thereupon, a majority of the canvass committee (Gelston, Tillotson, Smith, Graham, Van Cortlandt, McCarty, Havens) rejected the ballots from all three counties and declared George Clinton duly elected governor by a majority of 108 votes. Van Cortlandt was elected lieutenant governor.

The minority (Jones, Roosevelt, Gansevoort, Sands) protested in writing. In Otsego County, John Jay had a majority of about 400, and discounting the small majorities for Clinton in Tioga and Clinton counties, would have won the election. Clinton was accused by the Federalists of usurpation and the canvass committee of having made a partisan decision against the wishes of the electorate.

Notes

Sources
Result: The Tribune Almanac 1841

See also
New York gubernatorial elections
New York state elections

1792
New York
Gubernatorial